The Philippines men's national basketball team, led by head coach Chot Reyes qualified for the 2017 FIBA Asia Cup and the first round of the 2019 FIBA Basketball World Cup Asian qualifiers by earning the sole Southeast Asia berth at the 2017 SEABA Championship. In the first round of the FIBA Basketball World Cup qualifiers the Philippines was grouped with Australia, Japan and Chinese Taipei. They won over Japan in Tokyo and secured a win over Chinese Taipei at home in Quezon City. They will play against the two teams one more time as well as Australia twice in 2018.

Furthermore, two separate national teams were formed for both the 2017 FIBA Asia Cup and the Southeast Asian Games due to the overlapping schedule of the two competitions. Reyes mentored the team that participated in the FIBA Asia Cup while Jong Uichico coached the team that played at the Southeast Asian Games.

Prior to the FIBA Asia Cup stint the national team participated at the 2017 William Jones Cup.

Record

Uniforms

Tournaments

SEABA Championship

William Jones Cup

FIBA Asia Cup
Preliminary Round – Group B

Quarterfinals

5th–8th place semifinals

Seventh place game

Southeast Asian Games
Preliminary Round – Group A

Semifinal

Gold medal match

2019 FIBA Basketball World Cup qualifiers
Phase: Asia - First round

Rosters

SEABA Championship
This was roster of the Philippines national team for the 2017 SEABA Championship.

|}
| style="vertical-align:top;" |
 Head coach
 Chot Reyes
 Assistant coaches
 Jong Uichico
 Jimmy Alapag
 Team manager
 Butch Antonio

Legend
(C) Team captain
(NP) Naturalized Player
Club – describes lastclub before the tournament
Age – describes ageon May 12, 2017
|}

William Jones Cup
This was roster of the Philippines national team for the 2017 William Jones Cup.

|}
| style="vertical-align:top;" |
 Head coach
 Chot Reyes
 Assistant coaches
 Jong Uichico
 Joshua Vincent Reyes
 Jim Castro
 Jem Ryn Betia
 Team manager
 Butch Antonio

Legend
(C) Team captain
(I) Import
Club – describes lastclub before the tournament
Age – describes ageon July 16, 2017
|}

FIBA Asia Cup
On 25 July 2017, Philippines coach Chot Reyes released the final lineup for the Philippines for the 2017 FIBA Asia Cup. Christian Standhardinger, who played with the national team in the 2017 William Jones Cup, will be the team's naturalized player, with Andray Blatche unable to compete due to various reasons.

|}
| style="vertical-align:top;" |
 Head coach
 Chot Reyes
 Assistant coaches
 Joshua Vincent Reyes
 Jem Ryn Betia
 Team manager
 Butch Antonio

Legend
(C) Team captain
(NP) Naturalized player
Club – describes lastclub before the tournament
Age – describes ageon August 8, 2017
|}

Southeast Asian Games
The following is the roster of the Philippines national team for the 2017 Southeast Asian Games

|}
| style="vertical-align:top;" |
 Head coach
 Jong Uichico
 Assistant coaches
 Jimmy Alapag
 Team manager
To be announced

Legend
(C) Team captain
(NP) Naturalized Player
Club – describes lastclub before the tournament
Age – describes ageon August 19, 2017
|}

2019 FIBA Basketball World Cup qualification (Asia) – First Round
Versus Japan and Chinese Taipei
On 23 November 2017, Philippines coach Chot Reyes released the final lineup for the Philippines for the 2019 FIBA Basketball World Cup qualification match against Japan and Chinese Taipei.

See also
2016 Philippines national basketball team results

References

Philippines men's national basketball team results
2016–17 in Philippine basketball
2017–18 in Philippine basketball